Stéphane Ortelli (born 30 March 1970 in Hyères, Var, France) is a Monégasque professional racing driver with three world championship titles. He's also won the GT1 Class at the 12 Hours of Sebring in 2005 with David Brabham and Darren Turner. Currently, he is an Emil Frey Racing driver competing and developing the Jaguar and Lexus GT racing cars in the Blancpain Endurance Series and the VLN series.

Career
1995: Winner of Supertouring Criterium BMW/Oreca / 5 victories
1998: Winner of 24 Hours of Le Mans, Porsche 911 GT1-98
2002: Winner of Porsche Supercup 3 victories & 4 podiums
2002: Winner of FIA GT World Championship N-GT class Porsche 911 GT3-RS / 7 victories & 1 podium
2003: Winner of FIA GT World Championship N-GT class Porsche 911 GT3-RS / 3 victories & 3 podiums
2003: Winner of Spa 24 Hours Porsche 911 GT3-RS
2004: Winner of Porsche Cup / 5 victories & 7 podiums
2005: Winner of 12 Hours of Sebring in GT1 Class with Prodrive Aston Martin DBR9.
2005: World Touring Car Championship with Team Oreca (SEAT Toledo)
2005: Le Mans Series with Audi PlayStation Team Oreca (Audi R8) / 1 Win
2005: 24 Hours of Le Mans with Audi PlayStation Team ORECA (Audi R8) / 4th Overall
2006: Le Mans Series with Team Oreca (Saleen S7R) / 2 Victories
2007: Winner of Le Mans Series with Team Oreca (Saleen S7R)
2007: FIA GT Championship GT2 class with AF Corse (Ferrari F430)
2012: Winner of Blancpain Endurance Series with Belgian Audi Club Team WRT (Audi R8 LMS ultra)
2013: Winner of Blancpain Sprint Series/2013 FIA GT Series season with Belgian Audi Club Team WRT (Audi R8 LMS ultra)
2014: 3rd overall of Blancpain Endurance Series with Saintéloc Racing (Audi R8 LMS ultra)
2015: 3rd overall of Blancpain Endurance Series with Belgian Audi Club Team WRT (Audi R8 LMS ultra)
2015: Winner of the Sepang 12 Hours with Belgian Audi Club Team WRT (Audi R8 LMS)

Monza Le Mans Series 2008 crash
On 27 April 2008, during a Le Mans Series race at the Monza circuit, a mechanic issue caused his Courage car to slide and spin onto the grass. This in turn instigated a cartwheeling motion upon the vehicle, which resulted in most of the car's bodywork and all but one wheel being torn off before it came to rest on the opposite side of the track. It narrowly missed the tail of Allan McNish's Audi R10 which was in front. Ortelli sustained a broken ankle as a result.

Career results

24 Hours of Le Mans results

Partial Porsche Supercup results
(key) (Races in bold indicate pole position) (Races in italics indicate fastest lap)

† — Did not finish the race, but was classified as he completed over 90% of the race distance.

‡ — Not eligible for points.

Complete World Touring Car Championship results
(key) (Races in bold indicate pole position) (Races in italics indicate fastest lap)

FIA GT competition results

Complete GT1 World Championship results

Complete FIA GT Series results

Complete Blancpain GT World Challenge Europe results
(key) (Races in bold indicate pole position) (Races in italics indicate fastest lap)

References

External links
 
 

1970 births
Living people
Sportspeople from Hyères
Monegasque racing drivers
World Touring Car Championship drivers
French people of Italian descent
American Le Mans Series drivers
24 Hours of Le Mans drivers
24 Hours of Le Mans winning drivers
European Le Mans Series drivers
FIA GT1 World Championship drivers
Porsche Supercup drivers
Blancpain Endurance Series drivers
International GT Open drivers
24 Hours of Spa drivers
Team Joest drivers
Aston Martin Racing drivers
Oreca drivers
Walter Lechner Racing drivers
W Racing Team drivers
G-Drive Racing drivers
Emil Frey Racing drivers
Audi Sport drivers
Pescarolo Sport drivers
Porsche Motorsports drivers
Jaguar Racing drivers
Larbre Compétition drivers
Cheever Racing drivers
Alan Docking Racing drivers
Phoenix Racing drivers
AF Corse drivers
Nürburgring 24 Hours drivers
Saintéloc Racing drivers
Cupra Racing drivers
24H Series drivers